Mangin may refer to:
 Charles Mangin, French general
 Jean-Pierre Mangin, French philatelist
 Patrice Mangin, forensic pathologist
 Robert Mangin, British clergyman
 Thorleif Rattray Orde Mangin, British colonial administrator
 Mangin mirror, in optics, a type of back surface concave mirror